Herzenstein's rough sculpin (Asprocottus herzensteini) is a species of ray-finned fish belonging to the family Cottidae, the typical sculpins. These sculpins are endemic to Lake Baikal in Russia.  It was described by Lev Berg in 1906.  It dwells at a depth range of 22–887 metres, and is abundantly found below 60 m. Males can reach a maximum total length of 11.5 centimetres.

References

Herzenstein's rough sculpin
Taxa named by Lev Berg
Fish described in 1906
Fish of Lake Baikal